Katherine Mary Brown (born 24 January 1953) is an English former cricketer who played as a right-arm off break bowling all-rounder. She appeared in one Test match and two One Day Internationals for England between 1976 and 1979, as well as playing 3 matches for Young England at the 1973 World Cup. She played domestic cricket for Kent.

References

External links
 

1953 births
Living people
Cricketers from Essex
England women One Day International cricketers
England women Test cricketers
Kent women cricketers
Young England women cricketers